Tomiko (written: 富子, 都美子 トミ子 or トミコ in katakana) is a feminine Japanese given name. Notable people with the name include:

, wife of Ashikaga Yoshimasa and mother of Ashikaga Yoshihisa
, Japanese actress
Tomiko Lee, South Korean actress and film producer
, Japanese politician
, Japanese centenarian
, Japanese voice actress
, Japanese singer and actress
, Japanese racing driver

Fictional characters
Tomiko, a doll in the Groovy Girls line of fashion dolls

Japanese feminine given names